Aaron Cole (born 2 August 1973) is an Australian former professional basketball player. He played two seasons in the National Basketball League (NBL) for the Hobart Tassie Devils / Hobart Devils from 1995 to 1996. Cole averaged 1.6 points, 0.9 rebounds and 0.4 assists in 28 games played.

Cole was born in Melbourne, Victoria, and played for the Nunawading Spectres during his junior years. He played in the Continental Basketball Association (CBA) from 1993 to 1997.

References

1973 births
Living people
Australian men's basketball players
Basketball players from Melbourne
Guards (basketball)
Hobart Devils players